The 2021 S5000 Australian Drivers' Championship, known by its sponsored identity the VHT S5000 Australian Drivers' Championship, was the inaugural season of the Australian S5000 Championship, run after a series of exhibition races in 2019. The series was sanctioned by Motorsport Australia (MA) and promoted by the Australian Racing Group as part of the 2020 and 2021 Shannons Nationals Motor Racing Series. The season was held over 4 rounds, it began in January at Symmons Plains Raceway and ended in May at Sydney Motorsport Park. Joey Mawson won the Australian Drivers' Championship (MA Gold Star) title.

Teams and drivers 
The following teams and drivers were under contract to compete in the 2021 championship:

The following drivers only competed in practice and/or qualifying for the abandoned March 2020 round at Melbourne:

Race calendar 
The original 2020 calendar proposal was released on 29 October 2019, with six confirmed rounds, plus one non-championship round at the "Bathurst International", all held in Australia. Qualifying was held during the opening round at Melbourne, but the event was abandoned on March 13, 2020, as the headlining Australian Grand Prix had been cancelled by Formula 1 because of McLaren's withdrawal after a team member was tested positive for COVID-19.

With multiple disruptions delaying the season start due to the COVID-19 pandemic, heavy border restrictions in Australia further complicating the holding of the championship, and various calendar revisions that did not went ahead as scheduled, the season started in January 2021, with a four-round calendar where one venue was still to be announced. It included a round at Symmons Plains, which was not featured in the calendar until the May 2020 revision. Rounds at Winton and The Bend were not rescheduled, while the rounds at Melbourne and Bathurst were set apart from the calendar due to their later dates as support events for the Australian Grand Prix and the inaugural Bathurst International, being later featured as part of the end-of-year S5000 Tasman Series. The round at Phillip Island was later postponed and rescheduled. On 16 February 2021 it was announced the third round would be held at Sandown. As had been planned for 2020, the winner of each feature race received a trophy named in honour of former Australian racing drivers.

The following racetracks were included at some point on the 2020 calendar, but were not rescheduled for the 2021 Australian Drivers' Championship.

S5000 Tasman Series 
See: 2021 S5000 Tasman Series

The follow-up season, initially billed as the 2021–2022 S5000 Australian Drivers Championship, was planned to feature the inaugural holding of the S5000 International Triple Crown, a stand-alone series-within-the-series consisting of the three events held in Melbourne, Bathurst and Gold Coast, supporting the Australian Grand Prix, the Bathurst International and the Gold Coast 500 respectively. After the cancellation of the 2021 Australian Grand Prix, it was decided to instead revive the Tasman Series with the remaining 2021 rounds, separate from the S5000 Australian Drivers Championship that will be held in 2022.

Race results

Drivers' standings 
At each meeting, a qualifying session, two qualifying heats and a Main Event were held. Meeting points were awarded to the fastest ten qualifiers in qualifying, where the grid for the first heat was set. For the second heat, the top 75% from qualifying were reversed. The grid for the Main Event was defined by the points earned by the drivers across the weekend.

Notes

References

See also 

 2021 S5000 Tasman Series

External links

 2020 S5000 Australia Series Sporting and Technical Regulations, motorsport.org.au, as archived at web.archive.org on 6 June 2020

S5000 Championship
S5000 Australian
Australian S5000
Australian Drivers' Championship